English Text Construction  is a biannual peer-reviewed academic journal covering English studies, including applied linguistics, English language teaching, cultural studies, linguistics, and literary studies. It is  published by John Benjamins Publishing Company and was established in 2008. The journal publishes articles and book reviews, as well as review articles. The editors-in-chief are Gaëtanelle Gilquin (Université catholique de Louvain) and Lieven Vandelanotte (Facultés universitaires Notre-Dame de la Paix and Katholieke Universiteit Leuven).

Abstracting and indexing 
The journal is abstracted and indexed in Linguistics and Language Behavior Abstracts, MLA International Bibliography, and Scopus.

External links 

Linguistics journals
Publications established in 2008
English-language journals
John Benjamins academic journals
Biannual journals